Panagoda Cantonment is a cantonment located in the western Western Province of Sri Lanka. It serves as the regimental headquarters of many regiments of the Sri Lanka Army and is an arsenal. It also houses one of the main Military Hospitals operated by the Sri Lanka Army Medical Corps. It is one of the largest military bases in Sri Lanka.

List of regiment which has its regimental headquarters at the Panagoda Cantonment
Sri Lanka Light Infantry
Sri Lanka Artillery
Sri Lanka Engineers
Sri Lanka Signals Corps
Engineer Services Regiment
Sri Lanka Army Service Corps
Sri Lanka Army Ordnance Corps
Sri Lanka Army Medical Corps
Sri Lanka Army General Service Corps

References

Barracks in Sri Lanka
Cantonments of Sri Lanka
Residential buildings in Colombo District
Sri Lankan Army bases
Sri Lanka Artillery
Sri Lanka Light Infantry
Sri Lanka Signals Corps